.bs is the Internet country code top-level domain (ccTLD) for the Bahamas. It is administered by the University of the Bahamas.

Second level domains
There are six Second Level Domains:
com.bs: Commercial Entities 
net.bs: Network Providers 
org.bs: Non-commercial Organizations 
edu.bs: Educational Institutions 
gov.bs: Government Ministries and Agencies 
we.bs:  Can be registered by anyone

The .gov.bs domain name space is managed by DIT at the Bahamas Ministry of Finance.

See also
Internet in the Bahamas

References

External links
 IANA .bs whois information
 BSNIC

Communications in the Bahamas
Country code top-level domains

sv:Toppdomän#B